Philippe N'Dioro (born 24 June 1962) is a French former professional footballer who played as a forward. He made 94 appearances and scored 13 goals in Ligue 1 for Olympique Lyonnais and OGC Nice between 1980 and 1991.

References

External links

1962 births
Living people
Sportspeople from Moulins, Allier
French sportspeople of Cameroonian descent
French footballers
Footballers from Auvergne-Rhône-Alpes
Association football forwards
Ligue 1 players
Ligue 2 players
Le Puy Foot 43 Auvergne players
Olympique Lyonnais players
Limoges FC players
OGC Nice players
Red Star F.C. players